The 1987 Colonial Athletic Association men's basketball tournament was held February 28–March 2 at the Hampton Coliseum in Hampton, Virginia. 

Navy defeated  in the championship game, 53–50, to win their third consecutive CAA/ECAC South men's basketball tournament. The Midshipmen, therefore, earned an automatic bid to the 1987 NCAA tournament.

Bracket

References

Colonial Athletic Association men's basketball tournament
Tournament
CAA men's basketball tournament
CAA men's basketball tournament
CAA men's basketball tournament
Sports competitions in Virginia
Basketball in Virginia